Altendorf GmbH & Co. KG Maschinenbau, located in Minden, Germany, is a producer of sliding table saw and panel saw used in cabinetry and carpentry.

See also
 Woodworking machine

External links
 Company web site (German) | Company Web Site (US)
 Inside woodworking web site info on Altendorf

Companies based in North Rhine-Westphalia
Manufacturing companies established in 1906
Power tool manufacturers
Woodworking machines
German brands
1906 establishments in Germany
Tool manufacturing companies of Germany